Senator Edmonds may refer to:

Beth Edmonds (born 1950), Maine State Senate
John W. Edmonds (1799–1874), New York State Senate